Niger Delta University (NDU) is in Wilberforce Island, Bayelsa State in the southern part of Nigeria. It was established in 2000. It is a Bayelsa state government-funded university. In 2002, It was established by Chief DSP Alamieyeseigha, then governor of Bayelsa state.  It has two main campuses, one in the state capital, Yenagoa, which contains the law faculty, and the other in Amassoma. It also has its teaching hospital known as Niger Delta University Teaching Hospital (NDUTH) in Okolobiri.

The university offers education at Bachelor, Masters and PhD levels. It is a member of the Association of Commonwealth Universities. It is accredited and recognized by the National Universities Commission (NUC)

Faculties
The university has thirteen (13) faculties. The faculties and their respective departments are:

Faculty of Agricultural Technology
 Department of Agricultural Economics and Rural Sociology
 Department of Crop Production
 Department of Fisheries
 Department of Livestock Production

Faculty of Arts
 Department of English and Literary Studies
 Department of History/Diplomacy
 Department of Philosophy
 Department of Religious Studies
 Department of Theatre Arts

Faculty of Environmental Sciences
 Department of Architecture
 Department of Fine and Applied Arts

Faculty of Basic Medical Sciences
Department of Biochemistry
Department of Medical laboratory science
Department of Anatomy
Department of Physiology
Department of Pathology
Department of Pharmacology

Faculty of Clinical sciences
Department of Community Medicine and Public Health
Department of Family Medicine
Department of Radiology
Department of Dentistry
Department of Surgery
Department of Medicine
Department of Obstetrics and Gynaecology
Department of Paediatrics

Faculty of Engineering
 Department of Agricultural Engineering
 Department of Chemical/Petroleum/Petrochemical Engineering
 Department of Civil Engineering
 Department of Electrical/Electronic Engineering
 Department of Marine Engineering
 Department of Mechanical Engineering

Faculty of Education
 Department of Curriculum and Instruction with options in Biology, Chemistry, Economics, English Language, Fine and Applied Arts, French, Geography, Health Education, History, Mathematics, Physics, Physical Education, Political Science and Religious Studies.
 ? with options in Adult Community Education, Education Administration, Guidance and Counseling and Primary Education
 Department of Vocational/Industrial Education with options in Agricultural Education, Business Education, Secretarial Education and Technical Education

Faculty of Law

Faculty of Management Sciences
 Department of Accountancy
 Department of Banking, Finance and Insurance
 Department of Business Administration
 Department of Marketing
 Department of Office Management Technology

Faculty of Nursing

Faculty of Pharmacy
 Department of Clinical Pharmacy and Pharmacy Practice
 Department of Pharmaceutical & Medicinal Chemistry
 Department of Pharmacognosy & Herbal Medicine
 Department of Pharmaceutics & Pharmaceutical Technology
 Department of Pharmaceutical Microbiology & Biotechnology
 Department of Pharmacology & Toxicology

Faculty of Sciences
 Department of Biological Science
 Department of Computer Science
 Department of Geology
 Department of Mathematics
 Department of Microbiology
 Department of Physics
 Department of Pure and Applied Chemistry

Faculty of Social Sciences
 Department of Economics
 Department of Geography and Environmental Management
 Department of Political Science
 Department of Sociology
 Department of Mass Communication

Former Vice Chancellors
 Professor John Cecil Buseri {Pioneer VC}
 Professor Chris Ikporukpo
 Professor Humphrey Ogoni
 Professor Samuel Gowon Edoumiekumor {current}

History

The establishment of the university through a law in 2000 was a significant turning-point in the educational and socio-economic history of Bayelsa State in particular and Nigeria in general.

The university, which started academic activities in the 2001/2002 session, had its pioneer set of graduating students in the 2004/2005 academic year. Although, the student population was only 1,039 at inception, this increased to 4,636 in 2003/2004 and later 10,294 in 2006/2007. The university maintains the quota provided by the National Universities Commission (NUC). There has been a significant increase in the number of academic and non-teaching staff.

Campuses
The university is in Wilberforce Island, approximately 32 km from the state capital Yenagoa and is made up of three campuses: Gloryland (main campus), College of Health Sciences, and the temporary campus of the Faculty of Law in Yenagoa. A new campus, which is an extension of the Gloryland campus, is being developed with Standard Faculty buildings, School of Postgraduate Studies, DOCERAD, Senate Building(Under Construction), inter  alia.

References

External links

Association of Commonwealth Universities Members in Nigeria

Public universities in Nigeria
Educational institutions established in 2000
2000 establishments in Nigeria
Organizations based in Bayelsa State